The Tōkyō proportional representation block, or more formally the proportional representation tier , is one of eleven proportional representation (PR) "blocks", multi-member constituencies for the House of Representatives in the Diet of Japan. It consists solely of the prefecture of Tokyo making it one of two blocks covering only one prefecture, the other being Hokkaido. Following the introduction of proportional voting Tokyo elected 19 representatives by PR in the 1996 general election, and 17 since the election of 2000 when the total number of PR seats was reduced from 200 to 180.

Summary of results 
Beyond remote parts of Western Tokyo on the mainland and the Izu and Ogasawara islands, Tokyo's population is concentrated in urban and suburban areas. Reformist and left-of-center parties have usually won a majority of votes and seats. In the landslide "postal privatization" election of 2005 though, the LDP won a record 2.6 million votes in Tokyo; it would have received eight seats but hadn't nominated enough candidates: Of its 30 PR list candidates, 24 concurrently ran in single-member districts as dual candidates; 23 won their district races, leaving only a total of seven list candidates to be elected by PR. One seat went to the SDP as it would have been assigned a hypothetical, 18th seat under the d'Hondt method.

Party names are abbreviated as follows (format: abbreviation, translated name, Japanese name, English name):
 DPJ "Democratic Party", Minshutō, Democratic Party of Japan
 LDP Liberal Democratic Party, Jiyūminshutō
 Kōmeitō "Justice Party", Kōmeitō, Komeito
 JCP Japanese Communist Party, Nihon Kyōsantō
 SDP Social Democratic Party, Shakaiminshutō
 NFP New Frontier Party, Shinshintō
 LP Liberal Party, Jiyūtō
 YP "Everybody's Party", Minna no Tō, Your Party
 NSP New Socialist Party, Shin-shakaitō
 LL Liberal League, Jiyū-rengō
 IC "Assembly of Independents", Mushozoku no Kai, Independents' Club
 SP Socialist Party, Shakaitō
 CP Conservative Party, Hoshutō
 NPN New Party Nippon, Shintō Nippon
 PNP People's New Party, Kokumin Shintō
 HRP Happiness Realization Party, Kōfuku-jitsugen-tō

List of representatives
Note: Party affiliations as of election day.

Election result 2009

References 

 JANJAN, The Senkyo: Results of general and by-elections for the House of Representatives 1890–2010

Politics of Tokyo
PR Tokyo